Crystal Mountain is an unincorporated community and census-designated place in Benzie County in the U.S. state of Michigan. The population was 59 at the 2020 census.  Crystal Mountain is located within Weldon Township.

The CDP includes the Crystal Mountain Resort & Spa and Michigan Legacy Art Park.

Geography
The Crystal Mountain CDP is located in the southern part of Weldon Township in southern Benzie County. The CDP's southern border is the Manistee County line. The northeast edge of the CDP is formed by M-115, the Cadillac Highway.

The majority of the CDP's area is taken up by the Crystal Mountain Resort, which occupies all of the Buck Hills southwest of M-115, as well as flat land at the base of the hills.

History
The community of Crystal Mountain was listed as a newly-organized census-designated place for the 2010 census, meaning it now has officially defined boundaries and population statistics for the first time.

Demographics

Male population 51%

Female population 49%

Citizen US Born 100%

.

References

External links
Crystal Mountain Resort
Michigan Legacy Artpark

Traverse City micropolitan area
Census-designated places in Michigan
Unincorporated communities in Benzie County, Michigan
Unincorporated communities in Michigan
Census-designated places in Benzie County, Michigan